Hietalahti (Sandviken in Swedish) may refer to:

Hietalahti, Helsinki is a seaside district in Helsinki, Finland
Hietalahti, Vaasa is a seaside district in Vaasa, Finland
Hietalahti shipyard

People with the surname
Kari Hietalahti (born 1964), Finnish actor and writer
Vesa Hietalahti (born 1969), Finnish biathlete

Finnish-language surnames